The Gap Fire was a fire that burned  of the Santa Ynez Mountains above Goleta, California between July 1 and July 28, 2008. The fire burned primarily on steep slopes above the community of Goleta. Dense brush that had not burned in over fifty years, coupled with steep terrain made the fire challenging for firefighters.

Initial efforts by the Santa Barbara County Fire Department nearly contained the fire before it broke loose. When the first engine arrive on scene at 5:32 p.m. on July 1, the fire was less than a quarter acre, but then winds came up and swept the fire over the ridge and down into drainage. By July 3 the fire had grown to more than  forcing the county to declare a state of emergency. During the initial operational periods, the fire was driven downhill by Sundowner winds and burned to the edges of Goleta requiring the multiple strike teams for structure protection. After the initial 48 hours, the winds died down allowing firefighters to begin working in the mountainous terrain to contain the fire.

Power Issues 
The fire caused major power issues for residents and businesses in Goleta, Isla Vista, Santa Barbara and even as far south as Montecito. Southern California Edison high voltage transmission lines carrying power to the region pass directly through the area of the fire. During the peak of the outages, over 150,000 customers were reported to be without power.

Relief efforts 
Emergency response organization Direct Relief provided 35,000 free NIOSH N-95 particulate respirators to local residents.

References

2008 California wildfires
Santa Ynez Mountains
Wildfires in Santa Barbara County, California
July 2008 events in the United States